Sir Joseph Henry Hawley Bt. (1813–75) was a noted English thoroughbred race horse owner and breeder.

Life
Hawley was born in Harley Street, London, on 27 October 1813 , the eldest in a family of ten children. His parents were Sir Henry Hawley, 2nd Baronet, who died in 1831, and his wife Catherine Elizabeth Shaw, daughter of Sir John Gregory Shaw, 5th Baronet.

In his early career Hawley trained privately at Fyfield in Wiltshire. Four of his horses won The Derby:  Teddington (1851), Beadsman (1858), Musjid (1859) and Blue Gown (1868). Other classic horseracing wins were Fitz-Roland in the 1858 2,000 Guineas, Aphrodite in the 1851 1,000 Guineas, Miami in the 1847 Oaks and Pero Gomez in the 1869 St Leger. He thus won all five English Classics. He was the breeder of the 1874 Belmont Stakes winner Saxon.

Hawley served as High Sheriff of Kent for 1844. He disposed of land in Shropshire, in the family since the 1st baronet married Dorothy Ashwood of Madeley.

Family
Hawley, then of Leybourne Grange, Kent, married on 18 June 1839, at St George's Hanover Square, Sarah Diana, third daughter of General Sir John Gustavus Crosbie, GCH, of Watergate House, Up Marden, Chichester, Sussex (1765-1843). They had three daughters: Mabel-Diana (died 12 April 1852); Mildred-Catherine (died 1902) who married Captain Barrington Campbell, Scots Guards (later Lord Blythswood); and Morna-Georgina (died 1919), who married 25 June 1874 Percy-Fitzhardinge Raymond-Barker of Fariford Park, county Gloucestershire (died 1895).

The novelist Henry Hawley Smart, Hawley's nephew, set several of his books in the racing world.

See also
 Hawley baronets

References

1813 births
1875 deaths
British racehorse owners and breeders
Owners of Epsom Derby winners
High Sheriffs of Kent